Madipally is a nearly 400-year-old village in the Mahabubabad district of the Indian state of telangana. It is 6 km from Thorrur, which is about 60 km from Warangal. It is 125 km from Hyderabad.

Sub Villages in Madipally
 Somavaram Kunta Thanda
 Chowlla Thanda
 Pilligundla Thanda
 Kotagani thanda

Wells
Chelama is the oldest well in the village, dug approximately 200 years ago. Water from this well is considered pure by the villagers. Although Madipally is connected to municipal water through pipeline, villagers prefer well water for drinking. Villagers take at least two pots of water from this well each day. The base of the well is a huge stone which the villagers are unwilling remove for fear of disturbing the water. The stone increases the chances of water contamination. Despite the stone at the base of the well, it has never run dry.

Buruju
Buruju is a building almost 400 years old. It is used to store weapons with protection in front. Visitors reach the top via stairs. It belongs to Vatte Mahesh Chander Reddy.

Festival
Villagers celebrate the Dussera festival in front of Gadi Maisamma (goddess).
It celebrates in two places
Vatte Mahesh chander Reddy Gadi
Ramasahayam Kishore Reddy Gadi 
In this festival The villagers are gives Bali of Male sheep.

School
Madipally children have access to primary education from a school in the village. The school's building walls have the Indian map painted on them as well as Indian national leaders' photos.

Village Presidents
The following people have served as the sarpanch to Madipally village:

Village MPTCS
 Nalamasa Uppalaiah
 Dharavat Laxmi
 Mandula Muthayalamma
 Jakka Mahibub reddy
Thurpati Chinna Anjaiah

Economy
The village is currently undergoing development. Agriculture is the primary occupation. Residents cultivate rice, corn, turmeric, cotton and tamarind, mirchi.

The water facility is insufficient. No freshwater lake is available for irrigation. The well it is not suitable. Four types of lands exist in the village:

 Ragadi (more fertile)
 Errachekka (moderate fertile) 
 Telle dhubba (less fertile) 
 Savuda Nella (infertile)

Villages in Mahabubabad district